Eric Pillai is an Indian sound engineer, mixing engineer and music producer. He is best known for his mix of Aashiqui 2 soundtrack for which he won GiMA Award for Best Recording Engineer.

Early life and career
Pillai aspired to become a music producer and recording engineer since the age of 11. In 1999 he started working independently and in 2011 he built his own recording setup named as Future Sound of Bombay.

Accolades
Pillai won the GiMA Award for Best Recording Engineer for his mix of the soundtrack of Aashiqui 2. Pillai subsequently won International Indian Film Academy award, in the category of Best Recording Engineer for the song Galliyan.

References

Living people
Indian record producers
Audio production engineers
Year of birth missing (living people)